Route 153 is a Connecticut state highway in the Connecticut River valley running from U.S. Route 1 in Westbrook center to Route 154 in Essex Village in the town of Essex.

Route description

Route 153 begins as Essex Road in downtown Westbrook, at an intersection with US 1. It heads north, passing by the Westbrook railroad station and the access road to the Tanger Outlet Mall, before intersecting with I-95 at Exit 65 about half a mile north of US 1. Route 153 continues northeast through the eastern part of the town of Westbrook for another  before entering the town of Essex. Route 153 continues northeast towards Essex Village along Plains Road; Westbrook Road continues north as an unsigned state highway (designated as State Road 604) towards the village of Centerbrook. Route 153 intersects with Route 9 (at Exit 3) about  beyond the split and soon ends at an intersection with Route 154 just each of the interchange.

History
The Westbrook to Centerbrook route was designated as a secondary state highway in the 1920s and was known as Highway 332. Route 153 was established as a renumbering of old Highway 332 in the 1932 state highway renumbering. When first created, the northern end of Route 153 ran along Westbrook Road like the old highway. In January 1967, the northern end was rerouted to its current location to accommodate an interchange with the Route 9 freeway.

Junction list

References

External links

153
Transportation in Middlesex County, Connecticut